The Battle of Rybnica, one of many clashes of the January Uprising, took place on October 20, 1863, near the village of Rybnica, which at that time belonged to Russian-controlled Congress Poland. A party of 650 Polish insurgents, commanded by Dionizy Czachowski, clashed with a 500-strong detachment of the Imperial Russian Army. The clash ended in rebel victory; Russian losses were estimated at app. 50–60 killed, while Poles lost 27 killed and 30 wounded.

On October 20, Czachowski and his party crossed the Vistula river, and headed northwards. News of the insurgent unit presence reached the town of Staszów, in which stationed a Russian garrison of infantry and dragoons. Russian commandant, Major Chuti, decided to set a trap for the marching insurgents, near the village of Rybnica, where the road went along the bottom of a valley. Russians took positions on the top of a hill, at the edge of  a forest.

Russian attack began at app. 3 p.m., when Cossacks shot at insurgent cavalry. Polish commanders managed to prevent panic among their ranks, and soon afterwards, insurgent infantry supported by scythemen attacked Russian soldiers. Due to Polish pressure, Cossacks had to withdraw across a river, where many drowned.

The skirmish lasted for some 90 minutes, after which Russians retreated northwards. Their commandant, Major Chuti, did not give up and on the next day attacked the insurgents at Jurkowice.

References

Sources 
Stefan Kieniewicz: Powstanie styczniowe. Warszawa: Państwowe Wydawnictwo Naukowe, 1983. .

Rybnica
1863 in Poland
Rybnica
October 1863 events